The Department for Education (DfE) is a department of His Majesty's Government responsible for child protection, child services, education (compulsory, further and higher education), apprenticeships and wider skills in England.

A Department for Education previously existed between 1992, when the Department of Education and Science was renamed, and 1995 when it was merged with the Department for Employment to become the Department for Education and Employment.

The Secretary of State for Education is Rt Hon. Gillian Keegan MP. Susan Acland-Hood is the Permanent Secretary.

The expenditure, administration and policy of the Department for Education are scrutinised by the Education Select Committee.

History

The DfE was formed on 12 May 2010 by the incoming Coalition Government, taking on the responsibilities and resources of the Department for Children, Schools and Families (DCSF).

In June 2012 the Department for Education committed a breach of the UK's Data Protection Act due to a security flaw on its website which made email addresses, passwords and comments of people responding to consultation documents available for download.

In July 2016, the department took over responsibilities for higher and further education and for apprenticeship from the dissolved Department for Business, Innovation and Skills.

Predecessor bodies

 Committee of the Privy Council on Education, 1839–1899
 Education Department, 1856–1899
 Board of Education, 1899–1944
 Ministry of Education, 1944–1964
 Department of Education and Science, 1964–1992
 Department for Education, 1992–1995
 Department for Education and Employment (DfEE), 1995–2001
 Department for Education and Skills (DfES), 2001–2007
 Department for Children, Schools and Families (DCSF), 2007–2010

Responsibilities
The department is led by the Secretary of State for Education. The Permanent Secretary from December 2020 is Susan Acland-Hood. DfE is responsible for education, children's services, higher and further education policy, apprenticeships, and wider skills in England, and equalities. The predecessor department employed the equivalent of 2,695 staff as of April 2008 and as at June 2016, DfE had reduced its workforce to the equivalent of 2,301 staff. In 2015–16, the DfE has a budget of £58.2bn, which includes £53.6bn resource spending and £4.6bn of capital investments.

Ministers
The Department for Education's ministers are as follows:

Board
The management board is made up of:

 Permanent Secretary – Susan Acland-Hood
 Director-General, Social Care, Mobility and Disadvantage – Indra Morris
 Director-General, Higher and Further Education Group – Paul Kett
 Director-General, Early Years and Schools – Andrew McCully
 Chief Financial and Operating Officer, Operations Group – Mike Green
 Chief Executive, Education & Skills Funding Agency – David Withey

Non-executive board members:
 Marion Plant OBE; CEO of the Midland Academies Trust and Principal
 Baroness Ruby McGregor-Smith CBE; Former Chief Executive of Mitie Group
 Ian Ferguson CBE; businessman

Locations
As at 2 August 2016, the DfE has five main sites:
 Sanctuary Buildings, Great Smith Street, London
 Piccadilly Gate, Manchester
 2 St Paul's Place, Sheffield
 Bishopsgate House, Darlington
 Cheylesmore House, Coventry

Agencies and public bodies

Agencies

Education and Skills Funding Agency
The Education and Skills Funding Agency (ESFA) was formed on 1 April 2017 following the merger of the Education Funding Agency and the Skills Funding Agency.  Previously the Education Funding Agency (EFA) was responsible for distributing funding for state education in England for 3- to 19-year-olds, as well as managing the estates of schools, and colleges and the Skills Funding Agency was responsible for funding skills training for further education in England and running the National Apprenticeship Service and the National Careers Service. The EFA was formed on 1 April 2012 by bringing together the functions of two non-departmental public bodies, the Young People's Learning Agency and Partnerships for Schools. The SFA was formed on 1 April 2010, following the closure of the Learning and Skills Council. David Withey is the agency's Chief Executive.

Teaching Regulation Agency
The Teaching Regulation Agency (TRA) is responsible for regulation of the teaching profession, including misconduct hearings. Its predecessors include the National College for Teaching and Leadership (to 2018), the Teaching Agency (to 2013) and the Training and Development Agency for Schools (from 1994).

Standards and Testing Agency 
The Standards and Testing Agency (STA) is responsible for developing and delivering all statutory assessments for school pupils in England. It was formed on 1 October 2011 and took over the functions of the Qualifications and Curriculum Development Agency. The STA is regulated by the examinations regulator, Ofqual.

Public bodies
The DfE is also supported by 10 public bodies:

Devolution
Education, youth and children's policy is devolved elsewhere in the UK.
The department's main devolved counterparts are as follows:

Scotland

Scottish Government – Learning and Justice Directorates

Northern Ireland
 Department of Education
 Executive Office (children and young people)

Wales
 Welsh Government – Department for Education and Skills

National Curriculum 2014
The Department for Education released a new National Curriculum for schools in England for September 2014, which included 'Computing'. Following Michael Gove's speech in 2012, the subject of Information Communication Technology (ICT) has been disapplied and replaced by Computing. With the new curriculum, materials have been written by commercial companies, to support non-specialist teachers, for example, '100 Computing Lessons' by Scholastic. The Computing at Schools organisation has created a 'Network of Teaching Excellence'to support schools with the new curriculum.

Post-16 area reviews
In 2015, the department announced a major restructuring of the further education sector, through 37 area reviews of post-16 provision. The 
proposals were criticised by NUS Vice President for Further Education Shakira Martin for not sufficiently taking into account the impact on learners; the Sixth Form Colleges' Association similarly criticised the reviews for not directly including providers of post-16 education other than colleges, such as school and academy sixth forms and independent training providers.

Funding and grants 
In 2018, The Department for Education confirmed their commitment to forming positive relationships with the voluntary and community sector.

In 2020 the department began funding the National Tutoring Programme which employed private companies to deliver the tuition including at least one which uses children as tutors, paying them £1.57 per hour. Tutors received up to £25 of the between £72 and £84 per hour the government paid the companies.

References

Further reading

External links
 
 Official department YouTube channel
 Official Flickr presence

See also 

 Education in England

 
Education in England
Education, England
Education ministries
Education policy in the United Kingdom
Governance of England
Public education in the United Kingdom
Government agencies established in 2010
2010 establishments in England
2010 establishments in the United Kingdom